Dr. Death (Dr. Karl Hellfern) is a supervillain appearing in publications by DC Comics. The character was created by Gardner Fox and Bob Kane as an enemy of the superhero Batman, and first appeared in Detective Comics #29 (July 1939). He is notable as the first traditional supervillain to be encountered by the Batman, as well as his first recurring foe.

Fictional character biography

Golden Age
In his first appearance in Detective Comics #29, Dr. Death develops a lethal chemical agent from pollen extract and enacts a plan to use the poison to extort money from wealthy Gotham City citizens. He is assisted by a large East Indian manservant, Jabah. He decides to eliminate Batman, and threatens to kill someone unless Batman stops him. Batman defeats his two henchmen, but is wounded when Jabah shoots him, though he escapes using a gas pellet. He then gets to Dr. Death's base, meeting him in his lab, and chases him around the building. To evade capture, Dr. Death ignites chemicals in his laboratory, presumably killing Jabah and himself in the resulting explosion. Dr. Death next appears the following month in Detective Comics #30. With a new accomplice, a Cossack named Mikhail, Dr. Death is this time successful in claiming a victim in his extortion scheme, but discovers from the widow that the poisoned man lost his fortune in the Great Depression. Batman intervenes in the plot, following Mikhail back to Dr. Death's base, and upon apprehending the doctor, discovers that his face had been horribly disfigured from the lab explosion, resulting in a brown, skeletal appearance.

The scriptwriter for Detective Comics #29 and #30 is an issue of dispute, leaving the creator of Dr. Death uncertain.  Batman creator Bob Kane is officially credited as scriptwriter of these issues, though later Gardner Fox, the scriptwriter of Detective Comics #31 and #32, claimed authorship.

Bronze Age revival
After several decades' absence, Dr. Death was reintroduced by writer Gerry Conway in Batman #345 and Detective Comics #512 (1982). Conway's story is an update of the original 1939 tale. In this version, Dr. Death is depicted as a paraplegic, but his deadly gas gimmick remains the same. He is assisted this time by a manservant named Togo.

Modern Age
Dr. Death was revived once again in Batgirl #42-44 and #50 (2003–2004) by writer Dylan Horrocks. The modern version of the character is a producer of biological weapons, often selling them on the black market to terrorists and other criminals. He is now depicted as a bald, gnome-like man wearing a lab coat and an oxygen mask. This incarnation of Dr. Death plays a minor role in Batman: War Games where he is seen working with the crime lord Black Mask, releasing a gas into a crowd of panicking gangsters. Batman suspects that he and Black Mask are attempting to wipe out their competition.

Dr. Death remains active in the DC Universe following the events of Infinite Crisis. In 52 #2, he is mentioned as one of many mad scientists who have gone missing. He is depicted later in the series among other captured scientists and mad geniuses on Oolong Island that make up the Science Squad.

He was seen joining forces with Black Mask again in Batman #692 in his "Ministry of Science".

In Batman: Streets of Gotham #17-18, the reader learns his backstory, involving an altercation with Thomas and Martha Wayne as well an alliance with gangster Judson Pierce and Hush.

The New 52
In September 2011, The New 52 rebooted DC's continuity. Here, a new version of Dr. Death appears in Batman #25 as part of the story arc Batman: Zero Year. He is once again established as one of the first supervillains encountered by Batman early in his career. A disgruntled former Wayne Enterprises scientist, Dr. Death murders several people with a serum that causes uncontrolled bone growth. He is depicted with a skeletal appearance, a result of testing his serum on himself. Dr. Death joins forces with the Riddler to try to seize control of Gotham City during a super-storm.

In Batman #29 (2014), it is revealed that Hellfern created his bone serum in an attempt to eliminate human weakness. This was motivated by the death of his son, a soldier who had been sent to locate the missing Bruce Wayne overseas. Dr. Death battles Batman aboard a blimp in the midst of the storm. He is struck by shrapnel from an explosion, which causes his mutated bones to begin growing again, seemingly killing him.

Other characters named Doctor Death
 A different character named Doctor Death appears in Doom Patrol #107 (November 1966).
 In Sandman Mystery Theatre #21 (December 1994), Wesley Dodds encounters a serial killer named "Doctor Death", a.k.a. Dr. Raymond Kesslor. This Doctor Death is responsible for euthanizing his elderly patients, in a reference to Jack Kevorkian.
 A rogue MD styling himself "Doctor Death" is the villain of the Scoop Smith story in Whiz Comics #2. (This issue features the first appearance of Captain Marvel, later Shazam.)

In other media 
 Doctor Death's name appears in Doctor Psycho's phone in the Harley Quinn episode "A Fight Worth Fighting For".

References

Further reading
 The Encyclopedia of Super Villains by Jeff Rovin, Facts on File (1987)
 Men of Tomorrow: Geeks, Gangsters, and the Birth of the Comic Book by Gerard Jones, University of Michigan Press (2004)

Comics characters introduced in 1939
Golden Age supervillains
Characters created by Bob Kane
Characters created by Gardner Fox
Fictional mad scientists
Fictional characters with disfigurements
Fictional engineers
Fictional serial killers
DC Comics metahumans
DC Comics male supervillains
DC Comics scientists